Erbach is a town and the district seat of the Odenwaldkreis (district) in Hesse, Germany. It has a population of around 13,000.

Geography

Location
The town lies in the Mittelgebirge Odenwald at elevations between 200 and 560 m in the valley of the Mümling.

One geological peculiarity is the creek Erdbach's complete disappearance within Dorf-Erbach's community area. The Erdbach reappears near Stockheim. There are several places where the Erdbach disappears into the ground.

Neighbouring communities
Erbach borders in the north on the town of Michelstadt, in the east on the market town of Kirchzell (in Miltenberg district in Bavaria), in the south on the community of Hesseneck and the town of Beerfelden and in the west on the community of Mossautal (all three in the Odenwaldkreis). A planned merger with the neighbouring town of Michelstadt was blocked in November 2007 by a referendum (Bürgerentscheid). For the time being, ways are being sought to deepen the two towns' cooperation, and possibly consider a merger once again in a few years' time.

Constituent communities
Since the amalgamations within the framework of municipal reform in 1972, the district seat of Erbach has been made up of twelve Stadtteile:

History

Erbach has long been the residence of the Counts of Erbach, who trace their descent back to the 12th century, and who held the office of cup-bearer to the Electors Palatine of the Rhine until 1806. In 1532 the emperor Charles V made the county a direct fief of the Holy Roman Empire, on account of the services rendered by Count Eberhard during the Palatine Peasants' War.

In 1717 the family was divided into the three lines of Erbach-Fürstenau, Erbach-Erbach and Erbach-Schönberg, who rank for precedence, not according to the age of their descent, but according to the age of the chief of their line. In 1818 the counts of Erbach-Erbach inherited the county of Wartenberg-Roth, and in 1903 the count of Erbach-Schönberg was granted the title of prince. The county was incorporated with the duchy of Hesse-Darmstadt in the 19th century.

Governance

Town council

The municipal election held on 26 March 2006 yielded the following results:

Mayors
Buschmann was re-elected in 2012 with 52.7% of the votes.

Coat of arms
The town's arms might heraldically be described thus: Gules a bend wavy azure, thereon three mullets of six gules.

The wavy bend is taken to be a brook, and the mullets of six (six-pointed stars) were inspired by the arms formerly borne by the princely Counts of Erbach, who were lords of the Odenwald until 1806.

Town twinning
Erbach has partnerships with four towns in Europe:
 Ansião, Portugal
 Jičín, Czech Republic
 Königsee, Thuringia
 Le Pont-de-Beauvoisin, (Isère) and Le Pont-de-Beauvoisin (Savoie), France

Culture and sightseeing

Buildings

Castle of the Counts of Erbach-Erbach

Erbach Palace, the castle of the princely Counts of Erbach, was built into a residence in the style of the times in the 18th century. Since the noble house did not have the needed materials on hand, only the middle wing of the planned three-winged building was ever built. The façade is to a great extent built out of not sandstone, but rather sheeting or wood coloured to look like it.

The antique collections at the castle have remained almost unchanged since Count Franz I's time (1754–1823).

In 2005, the state of Hesse bought the castle for €13,000,000.

Within the castle complex is the likewise Late Baroque orangery with the castle garden.

Citizens' initiatives
In the area of the orangery and the castle garden, a citizens' initiative in the 1970s managed to thwart plans to tear down the orangery and build a highrise hotel on the site

The memorial on the castle square to Count Franz I – the last ruling count – that was knocked off its pedestal and thereby broken was repaired and set back in place with support from two Darmstadt artists and some Erbach citizens. The work was financed through grants from the Landesamt für Denkmalpflege ("State Office for Care of Monuments") as well as donations.

Regular events

Wiesenmarkt/Eulbacher Markt 
The Erbacher Wiesenmarkt ("meadow market") was originally called the Eulbacher Markt or Eulbacher Wiesen(Vieh-)markt. Eulbach is an outlying centre of the neighbouring town of Michelstadt. It was once a regionally very important livestock, horse and farm market.

The livestock and farm market was only moved to Erbach sometime in the late 19th or early 20th century by the Counts of Eulbach. Until about 1960, the livestock and horse market with its associated horseracing and other horse sports was the main part of the Eulbacher Markt. The Schützenhaus ("Marksmen's House") standing on the way into the Wiesenmarkt, however, suggests that the Eulbacher Markt, at least in part, must already have been held in Erbach as early as the mid 19th century: it was here that the Democratic Revolutionaries met in 1848 and on what is now the market grounds beside the Schützenhaus that the Odenwald "Moot" (Volksversammlung) was held under the Michelstadt revolutionary and lawyer Ludwig Bogen's leadership.

Museums
The Deutsches Elfenbeinmuseum Erbach ("Erbach German Ivory Museum") has been in existence since 1966 and is unique in Europe. Its exhibits are almost exclusively ivory. Visitors can also watch the resident carvers as they go about their artistic work.

Economy
Franz I, the last ruling count (1754–1823), introduced ivory carving in 1783, thus giving the town the nickname Elfenbeinstadt ("Ivory Town"). Many artists made their homes here and today their works and activities can still be admired at the town's Deutsches Elfenbeinmuseum Erbach. Owing to widespread bans since 1989, aimed at protecting animals, on dealing in ivory, nowadays comparable materials such as animal horns are used. Very popular as a material is prehistoric mammoth tusk, which is still found from time to time in Siberia. Besides the slightly different colour, this is comparable to elephant tusk ivory.

Established businesses
Bosch Rexroth AG, Erbach works, Electric Drives and Controls division
Rowenta, Erbach works (clothes iron manufacturing)
Koziol GmbH, plastic articles

Infrastructure

Transport
Erbach lies on Bundesstraßen 45 and 47, and also on the Odenwald Railway (RMV Line 65; Frankfurt–Darmstadt/Hanau–Erbach–Eberbach). A planned Bundesstraße 45 bypass proposed since the 1970s has once again been included in Hesse state planning.

Education
 Schule am Treppenweg (primary school)
 Astrid-Lindgren-Schule (primary school)
 Schule am Sportpark (Hauptschule and Realschule with transition level)
 Schule am Drachenfeld (special school with department for physically handicapped learners)

Notable people
 Franz, Count of Erbach-Erbach (b.1754 d.1823), nobleman and art collector
 Norbert Busè (b.1963), filmmaker and film producer
 Denis Huseinbasic (b.2001), football player
 Oka Nikolov (b.1974), Football goalkeeper
 Jessica Schwarz (b.1977), actress and presenter
 Timo Boll (b.1981), table tennis player
 Meike Weber (b.1987), Football player
  (b.1882 d.1942), farmer and Righteous among the Nations
 Christian Wilhelm Karl Kehrer (b.1775 d.1869), court painter and archivist
 Karl Christian Kehrer (b.1755 d.1833), portrait painter

References

External links

 

Franconian Circle
Odenwaldkreis
Grand Duchy of Hesse